B'z The "Mixture" is a compilation album of remastered hits by the Japanese rock duo B'z. The album reached 1st at Oricon, with almost 1.5 million copies sold.

As would become the band's custom, many of the songs on the album are re-recorded versions of earlier songs from their synthesizer-heavy pop music period.

Track listing 
""
"You&I" -Mixture mix-
"Oh! Girl" -Mixture style-
"Never Let You Go" -Mixture style-
"Joy" -Mixture mix-
"Ima de wa...Ima nara...Ima mo..." -Mixture style- (今では...今なら...今も... -Mixture style-)
"Kodoku No Runaway" -Mixture Style- (孤独のRunaway -Mixture style-)
"Move"
"Tokyo" -Mixture Mix- (東京 -Mixture mix-)
"Hole In My Heart" -Mixture Mix-
"Kara Kara" -Mixture Mix-
"Fushidara100%"
"Biribiri" -Mixture Mix- (ビリビリ -Mixture mix-)
"Hi"
"The Wild Wind"
"Anata Nara Kamawanai" (あなたならかまわない)

Certifications

References

External links 
 

B'z albums
Being Inc. remix albums
2000 remix albums